Naseer Kamel al-Chaderchi was a member of the Interim Iraq Governing Council, created following the United States's 2003 invasion of Iraq. al-Chaderchi is a Sunni Muslim and the leader of the National Democratic Party. A resident of Baghdad, al-Chaderchi is a lawyer, businessman, and farm owner; his father, Kamel al-Chaderchi was a leader in Iraq's democratic movement before Saddam Hussein's rise to power.

See also
 Politics of Iraq
 List of political parties in Iraq

References

Living people
People from Baghdad
National Democratic Party (Iraq) politicians
Year of birth missing (living people)